Ivania is a genus of flowering plants belonging to the family Brassicaceae.

It is native to Chile.

The genus name of Ivania is in honour of Ivan Murray Johnston (1898–1960), an American botanist. 
It was first described and published in Repert. Spec. Nov. Regni Veg. Vol.33 on page 188 in 1933.

Species:
Ivania cremnophila 
Ivania juncalensis

References

Brassicaceae
Brassicaceae genera
Plants described in 1933
Flora of Chile